The 2002 French Open was the second Grand Slam event of 2002 and the 106th edition of the French Open. It took place at the Stade Roland Garros in Paris, France, from late May through early June, 2002.

Both Gustavo Kuerten and Jennifer Capriati were unsuccessful in defending their 2001 titles; Kuerten was defeated in the fourth round by eventual champion Albert Costa, and Capriati was defeated by eventual champion Serena Williams in the semi-finals. Costa won his only Grand Slam title, defeating compatriot Juan Carlos Ferrero in the final. Serena Williams defeated her sister Venus to win her second Grand Slam title, her first French Open title, and the first of four consecutive Grand Slams in what was to be called the "Serena Slam".

Seniors

Men's singles

 Albert Costa defeated  Juan Carlos Ferrero, 6–1, 6–0, 4–6, 6–3 
It was Costa's 1st title of the year, and his 12th overall. It was his 1st (and only) career Grand Slam title.

Women's singles

 Serena Williams defeated  Venus Williams, 7–5, 6–3
It was Serena's 4th title of the year, and her 15th overall. It was her 2nd career Grand Slam title, and her 1st French Open title.

Men's doubles

 Paul Haarhuis /  Yevgeny Kafelnikov defeated  Mark Knowles /  Daniel Nestor, 7–5, 6–4

Women's doubles

 Virginia Ruano Pascual /  Paola Suárez defeated  Lisa Raymond /  Rennae Stubbs, 6–4, 6–2

Mixed doubles

 Cara Black /  Wayne Black defeated  Elena Bovina /  Mark Knowles, 6–3, 6–3

Juniors

Boys' singles
 Richard Gasquet defeated  Laurent Recouderc, 6–0, 6–1

Girls' singles
 Angelique Widjaja defeated  Ashley Harkleroad, 3–6, 6–1, 6–4

Boys' doubles
 Markus Bayer /  Philipp Petzschner defeated  Ryan Henry /  Todd Reid, 7–5, 6–4

Girls' doubles
 Anna-Lena Grönefeld /  Barbora Strýcová defeated  Su-Wei Hsieh /  Svetlana Kuznetsova 7–5, 7–5

Notes

External links
French Open official website

 
2002 in French tennis
2002 in Paris
May 2002 sports events in France
June 2002 sports events in France